K. G. Kenye is an Indian Politician from Nagaland. He belongs to Nationalist Democratic Progressive Party. He is currently serving as Cabinet minister in Government of Nagaland and member of Nagaland Legislative Assembly representing Chizami.

Political Career
He was the former Secretary-General of the Naga People's Front party, a regional party in Nagaland, Manipur and Arunachal Pradesh. He was former Advisor to the Chief Minister of Nagaland . He was elected to the Rajya Sabha for Nagaland seat after the incumbent, Khekiho Zhimomi died on 26 November 2015. As Khekiho Zhimomi was retiring on 2 April 2016, fresh election for a fresh term was held, and KG Kenye was elected unopposed on 14 March 2016. In 2023 he was elected as a candidate of Nationalist Democratic Progressive Party from Chizami Assembly constituency . On March 7,2023 he was inducted as Cabinet Minister

References

Living people
Rajya Sabha members from Nagaland
Naga People's Front politicians
People from Phek district
1960 births